Samiko (before 1923: Αλή Τσελεπή - Ali Tselepi) is a village in the municipality of Skillounta, Elis, Greece. In 2011 its population was 389. It is situated on a hill near the Ionian Sea, 2 km south of Kallikomo, 2 km southeast of Raches, 3 km north of Kato Samiko and 4 km southwest of Krestena.

Population

History

Samiko takes its name from the ancient Elean city Samikon, which was also known as Samos and Samia. It was probably identical with the Homeric Arene. Samikon was located in the ancient country of Triphylia, near the river Anigros. Near the city and the river was the cave of the Anigrid nymphs. The water here reputedly cured skin diseases. The remains of ancient Samikon have been found on a hill 1 km south of Kato Samiko.

See also

List of settlements in Elis

References

External links
Samiko at the GTP Travel Pages

Geography of ancient Elis
Cities in ancient Peloponnese
Skillounta
Populated places in Elis